"Haste to the Wedding" is a jig tune in the English, Scottish and Irish musical traditions. The tune originated during the 18th century, although its original composer is not certain. Written in the standard 8-bar AABB format of Gaelic music, it is traditionally performed on the fiddle, but is a simple tune which can be performed on a variety of instruments, and is frequently adapted for session music. The tune has also been used as the basis for songs, and as musical accompaniment for ceili dances of the same name.

History
The earliest known source for the tune is James Oswald's "Caledonian Pocket Companion", volume 10, page 8 (London, 1759), where it is titled "The Small Pin Cushion".  No source or composer is listed, which in Oswald's collections sometimes means he wrote it himself.

"The tune 'Come, Haste to the Wedding', of Gaelic origin, was introduced in the pantomime 'The Elopement' in 1767. This version is known as the Manx tune and was printed by the Percy society in 1846. It is the basis for the Manx ballad, 'The Capture of Carrickfergusby,' written by Thurot in 1760 (Linscott)." One of the tunes associated with the dance "Lady in the Lake" in N.H./ Widely known in the USA: in the repertory of Buffalo Valley, Pa., dance fiddler Harry Daddario .

According to one  theory, the name "Haste to the Wedding" derives from a tradition in County Donegal, Ireland, where the tune was played as the bride marched from her family home to the church on her wedding day. During the wedding of Queen Victoria and Prince Albert at St James's Palace in 1840, "Haste to the Wedding" was played by a marching band to the thousands waiting outside the chapel for the Queen's arrival.

In song

Traditional lyrics
Haste to the Wedding/Rural Felicity

In popular music

"Haste to the Wedding" was recorded by English folk rock group Fairport Convention as part of a medley of tunes - "Royal Selleccion Number 13" - on the 1977 album The Bonny Bunch of Roses.

"Haste to the Wedding" has been extensively played by Irish pop rock band The Corrs during their live performances. The most notable performance is the one from their 1999 concert The Corrs Live at Lansdowne Road which was later included as a bonus track on the special edition release of their 2000 album In Blue.

In 2005, The Corrs recorded a studio version of the song for their Irish-themed album Home.

In dance
In Scottish country dance, Haste to the Wedding is a progressive dance for 4 couples. The dance repeats after every 32 bars of music with couples in new positions.

In Irish ceili dance, Haste to the Wedding is also a progressive dance, but for any number of groups of 2 couples. The dance originated in the north of Ireland, and is collected in Ar Rinci Ceili, the ceili manual of An Coimisiún Le Rincí Gaelacha (the Irish Dancing Commission). In this  version, it takes 48 bars of music to complete once.

Notes

References

Source for notated version: Smith Paine (Wolfboro, N.H.) [Linscott]. Linscott (Folk Songs of Old New England), 1939; pg. 87. Sweet (Fifer's Delight), 1964/1981; pg. 24.

External links
Dance notes for the ceili dance of the same name
Volume 10 of the Caledonian Pocket Companion
Caledonian Pocket Companion, complete
Haste to the Wedding sheet music on The Session

Irish dances
Year of song unknown
Songwriter unknown
The Corrs songs